Redha Kramdi (born December 22, 1996) is a Canadian football linebacker for the Winnipeg Blue Bombers of the Canadian Football League (CFL). Kramdi won the Grey Cup in 2021 with the Blue Bombers, as a backup linebacker and special teams player. He played university football for the Montreal Carabins where he met Kerfalla Exumé who he called one of his best friends. Kramdi is the son of Algerian born in Canada and was initially attending F.A.C.E. School in Montreal, a fine arts grade school his parents wanted him to attend. Though he liked the school, he was not all that into the arts and asked his parents if he could attend École secondaire Dalbé-Viau in the borough of Lachine instead, in order to play his preferred sport of football. He was eventually drafted 16th overall by the Winnipeg Blue Bombers in the 2021 CFL Draft.

References

External links
Winnipeg Blue Bombers bio
cfl.ca bio

1996 births
Living people
Winnipeg Blue Bombers players
Canadian football linebackers
Canadian people of Algerian descent
Players of Canadian football from Quebec
Canadian football people from Montreal